Verzhbitsky is a surname. Notable people with the surname include:

Grigory Verzhbitsky (1875–1942), Russian military officer
Viktor Verzhbitsky (born 1959), Russian actor

Russian-language surnames